SC-9 or variants may refer to:
 South Carolina's 9th congressional district
 South Carolina Highway 9
 SC09, a FIPS 10-4 region code, see List of FIPS region codes (S–U)
 SC-09, a subdivision code for the Seychelles, see ISO 3166-2:SC
 (181711) 1993 SC9 (SC9 of 1993), an asteroid
 Shorts S.C.9
 10 Regional, formerly Nine Regional or Southern Cross Nine, an Australian television network
 Spooks: Code 9, a British television series